Sihlwald is a railway station in the Sihl Valley, and the municipality of Horgen, in the Swiss Canton of Zürich. The station is on the Sihltal line, which is operated by the Sihltal Zürich Uetliberg Bahn (SZU). The station takes its name from the surrounding Sihlwald forest and nature reserve, whose visitor centre is adjacent to the station.

Sihlwald was the original terminus of the Sihtal line, which was opened from Bahnhof Selnau in Zürich in 1892. In 1897 the Sihltal line was extended to Sihlbrugg station and a connection with the Zürich to Lucerne line of the Swiss Northeastern Railway (NOB). The station retains a locomotive shed dating from the time of that extension that is used by the heritage railway association Zürcher Museums-Bahn.

Today, the station is the formal terminus of service S4 of the Zürich S-Bahn, although the situation within a protected forest and with few other traffic generators nearby means that most S4 trains terminate at Langnau-Gattikon, one stop nearer Zürich, leaving this station to be served by one train an hour. The stretch of railway beyond Sihlwald to Sihlbrugg still exists, but no longer carries a regular passenger train service. The station is served by the following passenger trains:

Gallery

References

External links 

Railway stations in the canton of Zürich
Horgen
Railway stations in Switzerland opened in 1892